Gilpin Peak is a high mountain summit in the Sneffels Range of the Rocky Mountains of North America. Gilpin Peak was named in honor of William Gilpin, the first Governor of the Territory of Colorado.

Climate 
According to the Köppen climate classification system, Gilpin Peak is located in an alpine subarctic climate zone with long, cold, snowy winters, and cool to warm summers. Due to its altitude, it receives precipitation all year, as snow in winter, and as thunderstorms in summer, with a dry period in late spring. Precipitation runoff from the mountain drains into tributaries of the San Miguel and the Uncompahgre Rivers.

See also

List of Colorado mountain ranges
List of Colorado mountain summits
List of Colorado fourteeners
List of Colorado 4000 meter prominent summits
List of the most prominent summits of Colorado
List of Colorado county high points

References

External links

Mountains of Colorado
Mountains of Ouray County, Colorado
Mountains of San Miguel County, Colorado
Uncompahgre National Forest
North American 4000 m summits